The National Association of Basketball Coaches (NABC), headquartered in Kansas City, Missouri, is an American organization of men's college basketball coaches. It was founded in 1927 by Phog Allen, head men's basketball coach at the University of Kansas.

Formation of the NABC began when Joint Basketball Rules Committee, then the central governing authority of the game, announced without notice that it had adopted a change in the rules which virtually eliminated dribbling. Allen, a student of basketball founder James Naismith, organized a nationwide protest which ultimately resulted in the dribble remaining part of the game.

In 1939, the NABC held the first national basketball tournament in Evanston, Illinois at the Northwestern Fieldhouse.  Oregon defeated Ohio State for the first tournament championship. The next year, the NABC asked the NCAA to take over the administration of the tournament. In exchange, the NCAA provided complimentary tickets for NABC members to the Finals and placed an NABC member on its Tournament Committee.

NABC initiatives include establishing the original Basketball Hall of Fame in Springfield, Massachusetts, the format of today's NCAA basketball tournament, and the College Basketball Experience and National Collegiate Basketball Hall of Fame at the Sprint Center arena in downtown Kansas City, Missouri.  This facility was completed on October 10, 2007.

Awards
 NABC Player of the Year
 NABC Defensive Player of the Year
 NABC Freshman of the Year
 Pete Newell Big Man Award
 NABC Coach of the Year

All-District
NABC annually names its All-District Teams, which honors the top Division I players in each district.  Regions are divided by college athletic conferences.

Presidents

See also
Women's Basketball Coaches Association

References

External links
 

 
Basketball organizations
Coaching associations based in the United States
Sports in the Kansas City metropolitan area
Sports organizations established in 1927